Dennis McDougal (born November 25, 1947) is an American author and newspaper journalist. He has been called "L.A.'s No. 1 muckraker." His book, Privileged Son, was described as "illuminating reading for anyone interested in 20th-century Los Angeles or modern-day newspapering" by The New York Times. A native of Southern California, he lives near Memphis, Tennessee.

Early life and education 

Dennis McDougal is originally from Pasadena, California. After attending public school in the Los Angeles suburb of Lynwood, he received a bachelor of arts degree in English from University of California, Los Angeles, where he later earned a master's degree in journalism.

Military service 

From 1967 to 1969, McDougal was on active duty with the Naval Reserves. He served aboard the U.S.S. Annapolis in the South China Sea. In an interview with blogger Luke Ford, McDougal recalls his experience, much of which formed the basis for his first fiction novel The Candlestickmaker, published in 2011:

Career 

Before turning his attention full-time to writing books in 1993, McDougal reported on the glitzy and occasionally corrupt aspects of Hollywood as a staff writer for ten years at the Los Angeles Times, while previously working as a staff writer for The Riverside Press-Enterprise (1973–77) and The Long Beach Press-Telegram (1977–1981). From 2002 to 2006, he worked as a contributor for The New York Times.

In 2007, the controversy surrounding his book Privileged Son: Otis Chandler And The Rise And Fall Of The Los Angeles Times Dynasty—the newspaper McDougal once worked for—was discussed in an interview with McDougal on NPR's Morning Edition. The New York Times in a review called McDougal's book "illuminating reading for anyone interested in 20th-century Los Angeles or modern-day newspapering."

Between books, McDougal was a producer for CNN during the O.J. Simpson trial, where he was responsible for tracking down witnesses, relatives, and acquaintances for interviews as well as documents and public records for use on camera as the trial unfolded.

A longtime contributor to TV Guide, McDougal's last piece covered the murderous saga of actor Robert Blake and Bonny Lee Bakley.

Awards 

In 1982, McDougal was awarded a John S. Knight Fellowship at Stanford University and spent a year teaching and studying in Japan and Canada, as well as at the Palo Alto campus.

He has earned more than 50 honors, including a 1984 National Headliner Award and several Associated Press awards.

Books 

As of 2014, McDougal is the author of 11 books:

 Angel of Darkness (1991) A cult classic about Southern California serial murderer Randy Kraft, the mild-mannered computer whiz by day and lust killer at night, who holds the dubious distinction of being one of the most prolific murderers (approximately 67 victims) in modern U.S. history.
 Fatal Subtraction: How Hollywood Really Does Business (with Pierce O'Donnell) (1992) An inside look at Hollywood's landmark Art Buchwald v. Paramount trial, the Coming to America lawsuit that unveiled Hollywood's sleazy accounting practices and changed forever the way studios conduct business.
 In The Best of Families (1994) The "Best Fact Crime" in the Mystery Writers of America's Edgar Award nominee, this book recounts the descent into murderous madness of the family of Roy Miller, Ronald Reagan's attorney.
 Mother's Day (1998) The best-selling saga of a Sacramento mother of six who enticed two of her sons into a monstrous plot to torture and murder her own two daughters.
 The Last Mogul (1998) An unauthorized biography of Lew Wasserman, a Hollywood talent agent who later became head of Universal Studios. In his book, McDougal accuses Wasserman of mob ties, monopolistic practices and alludes to Ronald Reagan illegally favoring Wasserman.
 The Yosemite Murders (2000) In Yosemite National Park, Cary Stayner commits murder after murder as law enforcement scrambles to decipher anything that will save hapless vacationers.
 Privileged Son (2001) A biography of Los Angeles Times publisher Otis Chandler, and winner of the Fordham University Anne M. Sperber Award as the nation's best media biography in 2002  Privileged Son was later adapted into a PBS American experience documentary titled Inventing L.A.: The Chandlers and Their Times. In 2007, McDougal discussed his book on NPR's Morning Edition.
 Blood Cold, McDougal and Mary Murphy (2002) Former child actor, acclaimed star of In Cold Blood and iconic 1970s TV detective in Baretta, Robert Blake met Bonny Lee Bakley at a party and slept with her the same night. A Hollywood parasite and con artist known for elaborate Internet sex scams and a shameless pursuit of money and fame, Bakley wanted to marry a star and by the late 1990s, Blake was her target: a troubled has-been coasting on the fumes of past success. Six months after their quickie wedding, Bakley was shot to death in a parked car on a dark Hollywood side street, and the No. 1 suspect was Blake.
 Five Easy Decades: How Jack Nicholson Became the Biggest Movie Star in Modern Times (2008) A biography about the life of American film star Jack Nicholson. 
 The Candlestickmaker (2011) A work of fiction, based on McDougal's own experiences serving in the US Navy during the Vietnam War.
 Bob Dylan: The Biography (2014) Released May 13, 2014, it details the life and works of the folk rock legend Bob Dylan.

References

External links 
 Official Website
 Interview with Luke Ford
 Interview on Good Morning Memphis
 From L.A. to the World: Hollywood in Radio and in Press Panel Member
 WorldCat bibliography
 

1947 births
Living people
American non-fiction crime writers
Writers from Los Angeles
Los Angeles Times people
Stanford University Knight Fellows
American newspaper journalists
20th-century American biographers
21st-century American biographers